Friedrich Ehrbar was a piano manufacturer in Vienna, Austria.

History 
In 1876 he had the Palais Ehrbar with its own concert hall constructed, in which renowned artists such as Johannes Brahms, Anton Bruckner and Gustav Mahler performed. For the excellence of his products he was awarded an imperial and royal warrant of appointment to the Emperor and King of Austria-Hungary. He was also awarded a warrant of appointment to Archduke Otto, imperial warrant of appointment to the Ottoman Sultan, a royal warrant of appointment to the King of Greece, the King of Serbia, the King of Portugal, and many others.

His successor was Friedrich Benedict Ernst Ehrbar Jun. (1873-1921), who was also president of the Wiener Singakademie from 1900 until his death. He was also awarded an imperial and royal warrant of appointment to the Emperor and King of Austria-Hungary.

References

External links 

Piano makers
Piano manufacturing companies of Austria
Musical instrument manufacturing companies based in Vienna
Purveyors to the Imperial and Royal Court